Martim Afonso de Castro (died 3 June 1607 in Malacca) was a Portuguese Viceroy of India. He commanded the Portuguese Navy in the Battle of Cape Rachado and fought over the present day Malaccan exclave of Tanjung Tuan in 1606.

References

Further reading
 
 

Portuguese military officers
Viceroys of Portuguese India
1560 births
1607 deaths
People of the Dutch–Portuguese War
16th-century Portuguese people
17th-century Portuguese people